Elin Borg  (born 27 February 1990) is a Swedish football defender who currently plays for Södersnäckornas BK. She has played Damallsvenskan football for Linköpings FC, AIK, Kristianstads DFF.

References

External links
 

Swedish women's footballers
Linköpings FC players
AIK Fotboll (women) players
Kristianstads DFF players
Djurgårdens IF Fotboll (women) players
Damallsvenskan players
1990 births
Living people
Women's association football defenders